Paula Irvine (born June 22, 1968) is an American actress. Irvine began acting in 1976 by making guest appearances. In 1988 she starred in Phantasm II playing Liz Reynolds, and in 1990 she also appeared on Beverly Hills, 90210 during the first season as Sheryl and on Growing Pains as Lori McNeil. She is best known for her portrayal of the second Lily Blake Capwell on the NBC daytime drama Santa Barbara from 1991 to 1993.

References

External links

1968 births
American film actresses
American soap opera actresses
Living people
21st-century American women